USS Gallant may refer to the following ships of the United States Navy:

, a coastal patrol yacht commissioned 15 April 1942 and decommissioned 22 January 1945
, was an ocean minesweeper commissioned 14 September 1955 and decommissioned 29 April 1994

United States Navy ship names